The 33rd Edition Vuelta a España (Tour of Spain), a long-distance bicycle stage race and one of the three grand tours, was held from 25 April to 14 May 1978. Ferdi Van Den Haute won the points classification and Andrés Oliva won the mountains classification.

Teams and riders

Route

Results

General classification

Points classification

Mountains classification

Team classification

Intermediate sprints classification

References

 
1978 in road cycling
1978
1978 in Spanish sport
April 1978 sports events in Europe
May 1978 sports events in Europe
1978 Super Prestige Pernod